Destiny's Isle is a 1922 American silent drama film directed by William P.S. Earle and starring Virginia Lee, Ward Crane and Florence Billings.

Cast
 Virginia Lee as Lola Whitaker
 Ward Crane as Tom Proctor
 Florence Billings as Florence Martin
 Arthur Housman as Arthur Randall
 George Fawcett as Judge Richard Proctor
 William B. Davidson as Lazus
 Mario Majeroni asDr. Whitaker
 Ida Darling as 	Mrs. Pierpont
 Albert Roccardi as Mrs. Ripp
 Pauline Dempsey as 	Mammy

References

Bibliography
 Connelly, Robert B. The Silents: Silent Feature Films, 1910-36, Volume 40, Issue 2. December Press, 1998.
 Munden, Kenneth White. The American Film Institute Catalog of Motion Pictures Produced in the United States, Part 1. University of California Press, 1997.

External links
 

1922 films
1922 drama films
1920s English-language films
American silent feature films
Silent American drama films
Films directed by William P. S. Earle
American black-and-white films
1920s American films